Daniel Alberto Chafer (born 19 September 1981) is an Argentine footballer who plays for Chieti.

Biography
Chafer started his career at Italy for Castel Madama. In July 2003, he was signed by Chievo and farmed him to Lanciano in a co-ownership deal. In the next season he left for Gubbio of Serie C2 and in 2006 moved to Gubbio of same division but in different group. Since 2007, he played at Serie D, the top division of regional league and non-professional football.

In December 2009 he joined Chieti.

References

External links
Profile at Chieti 
Daniel Alberto Chafer at BDFA.com.ar 

Argentine footballers
Argentine expatriate footballers
S.S. Virtus Lanciano 1924 players
A.S. Gubbio 1910 players
A.S. Melfi players
S.S. Chieti Calcio players
Expatriate footballers in Italy
Association football forwards
Footballers from Santa Fe, Argentina
1981 births
Living people
Argentine expatriate sportspeople in Italy